Katsumata is a Japanese surname. People with the surname include:

 Isao Katsumata (born 1937), Japanese golfer
 Kiyokazu Katsumata, Japanese shogi player
 Seiichi Katsumata (1908–1989), Japanese politician and Soviet spy
 Susumu Katsumata (disambiguation), multiple people
 Tomoharu Katsumata (born 1938), Japanese film director
 Yoshinori Katsumata (born 1985), Japanese footballer

Japanese-language surnames